Miyandasht Rural District may refer to various places in Iran:
 Miyandasht Rural District (Isfahan Province)
 Miyandasht Rural District (Darmian County), South Khorasan province

See also:
Miyan Dasht Rural District, Jajrom County, North Khorasan province